Țiganca River may refer to:
 Țiganca, a tributary of the Gelug in Caraș-Severin County, Romania
 Țiganca River (Siret), in Neamț County, Romania
 Țiganca, a tributary of the Bărzăuța in Covasna and Bacău Counties, Romania